M. dubia may refer to:
 Monactis dubia, a flowering plant species found only in Ecuador
 Myrciaria dubia, the camu camu, Camucamu, cacari or camocamo, a small bushy river side tree species

See also
 Dubia (disambiguation)